Nastassja Aglaia Kinski (born 24 January 1961) is a German actress and former model who has appeared in more than 60 films in Europe and the United States. Her worldwide breakthrough was with Stay as You Are (1978). She then came to global prominence with her Golden Globe Award-winning performance as the title character in the Roman Polanski-directed film Tess (1979). Other films in which she acted include the erotic horror film Cat People (1982) and the Wim Wenders dramas Paris, Texas (1984) and Faraway, So Close! (1993). She also appeared in the notable biographical drama film An American Rhapsody (2001). Kinski is fluent in four languages: German, English, French and Italian. She is the daughter of German actor Klaus Kinski.

Early life
Kinski was born in West Berlin as Nastassja Aglaia Nakszynski. She is the daughter of renowned German actor Klaus Kinski and his second wife, actress Ruth Brigitte Tocki. She is of partial Polish descent, for her grandfather Bruno Nakszynski was a Germanized ethnic Pole. Kinski has two half-siblings: Pola and Nikolai Kinski. Her parents divorced in 1968. After the age of 10, Kinski rarely saw her father. Her young mother struggled financially to support them; they eventually lived in a commune in Munich.

In a 1999 interview, Kinski denied that her father had molested her as a child, but said he had abused her "in other ways". In 2013, when interviewed about the allegations of sexual abuse made by her half-sister Pola Kinski, she confirmed that he attempted this with her, but did not succeed. She said, "He was no father. Ninety-nine percent of the time I was terrified of him. He was so unpredictable that the family lived in constant terror." When asked what she would say to him now, if she had the chance, she replied, "I would do anything to put him behind bars for life. I am glad he is no longer alive."

Career
Kinski began working as a model as a teenager in Germany. Actress Lisa Kreuzer of the German New Wave helped get her the role of the mute Mignon in Wim Wenders 1975 film The Wrong Move, in which at the age of 13 she was depicted topless. She later played one of the leading roles in Wenders' film Paris, Texas (1984) and appeared in his film Faraway, So Close (1993).

In 1976, while still a teenager, Kinski had her first two major roles: in Wolfgang Petersen's feature film-length episode Reifezeugnis of the German TV crime series Tatort. Next, she appeared in the British horror film To the Devil a Daughter (1976), produced by Hammer Film Productions, which was released in the UK just 40 days after Kinski's fifteenth birthday, making it a virtual certainty she was only fourteen when her scenes were shot (including full frontal nudity). In regards to her early films, Kinski has stated that she felt exploited by the industry. In an interview with W, she said, "If I had had somebody to protect me or if I had felt more secure about myself, I would not have accepted certain things. Nudity things. And inside it was just tearing me apart."

In 1978, Kinski starred in the Italian romance Stay as You Are (Così come sei) with Marcello Mastroianni, gaining her recognition in the United States after New Line Cinema released it there in December 1979. Time wrote that she was "simply ravishing, genuinely sexy and high-spirited without being painfully aggressive about it." The film also received a major international release from Columbia Pictures.

Kinski met the director Roman Polanski at a party in 1976. He urged her to study method acting with Lee Strasberg in the United States and she was offered the title role in Polanski's upcoming film, Tess (1979). In 1978, Kinski underwent extensive preparation for the portrayal of an English peasant girl, which included acquiring a Dorset accent through elocution studies:

The film was nominated for six awards, including Best Picture, at the 53rd Academy Awards, and won three.

In 1981, Richard Avedon photographed Kinski with a Burmese python coiled around her nude body. The image, which first appeared in the October 1981 issue of US Vogue, was released as a poster and became a best-seller, further confirming her status as a sex symbol.

In 1982, she starred in Francis Ford Coppola's romantic musical One from the Heart, her first film made in the United States. Texas Monthly described her as acting "as a Felliniesque circus performer to represent the twinkling evanescence of Eros." The film failed at the box office and was a major loss for Coppola's new Zoetrope Studios. That year, she was also in the erotic supernatural horror movie Cat People. On December 29, 1982, Kinski made a puzzling appearance on the program Late Night with David Letterman, seeming somewhat oblivious to the jokes and everything else that was going on around her and appearing with an unusual hair style Letterman described as "looking like there was an owl perched on top of her head." (Letterman's second guest, John Candy, came out with his own hair moussed up in a pile as a spoof of Kinski's hair.)

Dudley Moore's comedy Unfaithfully Yours and an adaptation of John Irving's The Hotel New Hampshire followed in 1984.

Kinski reteamed with Wenders for the 1984 film Paris, Texas. One of her most acclaimed films to date, it won the top award at the Cannes Film Festival. Throughout the 1980s, Kinski split her time between Europe and the United States, making Moon in the Gutter (1983), Harem (1985) and Torrents of Spring (1989) in Europe, and Exposed (1983), Maria's Lovers (1984), and Revolution (1985) in the United States.

During the 1990s, Kinski appeared in a number of American films, including the action movie Terminal Velocity opposite Charlie Sheen, the Mike Figgis 1997 adultery tale One Night Stand, Your Friends & Neighbors (1998), John Landis's Susan's Plan (1998), and The Lost Son (1999).

Her most recent films include David Lynch's Inland Empire (2006) and Rotimi Rainwater's Sugar (2013). In 2016, she competed in the German Let's Dance show.

Personal life
In 1976, when Kinski was aged 15, it was speculated that there had been a romantic relationship with director Roman Polanski, who at the time was 43. Polanski confirmed the relationship in a 1994 interview with Diane Sawyer: "...what about Nastassja Kinski? She was young and we had a love affair." However, in a 1999 interview in The Guardian, Kinski was quoted as saying that there was no affair and that, "There was a flirtation. There could have been a seduction, but there was not. He had respect for me."

In the late 1970s, Kinski was roommates with a pre-fame Demi Moore. In her 2019 memoir Inside Out, Moore wrote: "We know each other in a way that no one else could."

Kinski has three children from different relationships. Her first child, son Aljosha Nakszynski (born 29 June 1984), was fathered by actor Vincent Spano, her co-star in Maria's Lovers. On 10 September 1984, Kinski married Egyptian filmmaker Ibrahim Moussa, with whom she had daughter Sonja Kinski (born 2 March 1986). The marriage was dissolved in July 1992. From 1992 until 1995, Kinski lived with musician Quincy Jones, though she kept her own apartment on Hilgard Avenue, near UCLA, at the time. They had a daughter, Kenya Julia Niambi Sarah Jones (born 9 February 1993), a model known professionally as Kenya Kinski-Jones.

In 1997, Kinski dated married producer Jonathan D. Krane during a brief separation from his wife, actress Sally Kellerman. Over the course of her career, Kinski has also been romantically linked with Paul Schrader, Jean-Jacques Beineix, Rob Lowe, Jon Voight, Gérard Depardieu, Dudley Moore, Miloš Forman and Wim Wenders. As of 2012, she was dating actor Rick Yune.

In 2001, Kinski stated in an interview in The Daily Telegraph that she was affected by the sleep disorder narcolepsy.

Awards and nominations

The awards and nominations received by Nastassja Kinski include one Art Film Fest Award, one Bambi Award, two Bravo Ottos (out of three nominations), two Deutscher Filmpreis Awards (also out of three nominations), one Golden Globe (out of two nominations), one Jupiter Award, one Nastro d'Argento Award and one Wine Country Film Festival Award.

Among others, her achievements in film industry include also two César Awards nominations, one Globo d'oro nomination, and one Saturn Award nomination.

Acting awards 
Bambi Awards

Bravo Otto Awards

César Awards

Deutscher Filmpreis Awards

A  Shared with Hans Christian Blech, Ivan Desny, Adolf Hansen, Marianne Hoppe, Peter Kern, Lisa Kreuzer, Hanna Schygulla and Rüdiger Vogler.
Globo d'oro Awards

Golden Globe Awards

Jupiter Awards

Nastro d'Argento Awards

Saturn Awards

Wine Country Film Festival Awards

B  Tied with Hege Schøyen for The Prompter.

Career achievement awards
Art Film Fest Awards

Moscow International Film Festival

Filmography

 The Wrong Move (1975)
 To the Devil a Daughter (1976)
 Tatort: Reifezeugnis (1977)
 Notsignale: Im Nest (1977)
 Passion Flower Hotel (also known as Boarding School, 1978)
 Così come sei (also known as Stay As You Are, 1978)
 Tess (1979)
 One from the Heart (1982)
 Cat People (1982)
 Exposed (1983)
 Spring Symphony (1983)
 Moon in the Gutter (1983)
 Maria's Lovers (1984)
 Paris, Texas (1984)
 The Hotel New Hampshire (1984)
 Unfaithfully Yours (1984)
 Harem (1985)
 Revolution (1985)
 Maladie d'amour (1987)
 Torrents of Spring (1989)
 Crystal or Ash, Fire or Wind, as Long as It's Love (1989)
 The Secret (1990)
 The Sun Also Shines at Night (1990)
 Humiliated and Insulted (1991)
 Faraway, So Close! (1993)
 Terminal Velocity (1994)
 Crackerjack (1994)
 The Ring (1996)
 Somebody Is Waiting (1996)
 Fathers' Day (1997)
 One Night Stand (1997)
 Bella Mafia (1997)
 Little Boy Blue (1997)
 Savior (1998)
 Susan's Plan (1998)
 Playing by Heart (1998)
 Your Friends & Neighbors (1998)
 The Lost Son (1999)
 The Intruder (1999)
 The Claim (2000)
 The Magic of Marciano (2000)
 Time Share (2000)
 Quarantine (2000)
 An American Rhapsody (2001)
 The Day the World Ended (2001)
 Town & Country (2001)
 Blind Terror (TV 2001)
 Say Nothing (2001)
 Cold Heart (2001)
 Diary of a Sex Addict (2001)
 .com for Murder (2002)
 Paradise Found (2003)
 Les Liaisons dangereuses (TV miniseries 2003)
 À ton image (2004)
 La Femme Musketeer (TV movie 2004)
 Inland Empire (2006)
 The Nightshift Belongs to the Stars (short, 2013)
 Sugar (2013)
 Police de caractères - Cadavre exquis (TV movie, 2022)
 Dark Satellites (2022)

References

External links

 
 
 

1961 births
20th-century German actresses
21st-century German actresses
Actresses from Berlin
Best Actress German Film Award winners
German child actresses
German female models
German film actresses
German people of Polish descent
Living people
New Star of the Year (Actress) Golden Globe winners
People with narcolepsy
Models from Berlin
Family of Quincy Jones